The 1993 FIRS Intercontinental Cup was the sixth edition of the roller hockey tournament known as the Intercontinental Cup, played in April 1993. HC Liceo La Coruña won the cup, defeating CDU Estudiantil.

Matches

See also
FIRS Intercontinental Cup

References

1993 in Spanish sport
International roller hockey competitions hosted by Spain
FIRS Intercontinental Cup
1993 in roller hockey